Egon Petri (23 March 188127 May 1962) was a Dutch pianist.

Life and career 
Petri's family was Dutch. He was born a Dutch citizen but in Hanover, Germany, and grew up in Dresden, where he attended the Kreuzschule. His father, a professional violinist, taught him to play the violin. While still a teenager, Petri played with the Dresden Court Orchestra and with his father's string quartet. He studied composition and theory with Hermann Kretzschmar and Felix Draeseke at the Dresden Conservatory.

From an early age Petri had also taken piano lessons and eventually, with strong encouragement from Ignacy Jan Paderewski and Ferruccio Busoni, he concentrated on piano. He studied with Busoni, who greatly influenced him, and Petri considered himself more a disciple than a student of his. Following his example, Petri focused on the works of Johann Sebastian Bach and Franz Liszt, who, along with Busoni himself, were at the centre of his repertoire.

During World War I, Petri moved with Busoni to Switzerland, where he assisted him in editing Bach's keyboard works. In the 1920s, Petri taught in Berlin; his students included Victor Borge, Stanley Gardner, Jan Hoffman, Gunnar Johansen, Hazel Harrison, Dimitar Nenov, and Vitya Vronsky. In 1923 he became the first non-Soviet soloist to play in the Soviet Union.

In 1927 he moved to Zakopane, Poland, where, until the outbreak of World War II in 1939, he conducted summer and early-fall sessions and piano master classes. Beginning with 1929 he made recordings for several labels, including Columbia Records.

Petri escaped from Poland the day before the German invasion in September 1939, but he had to leave behind all his books, music and letters, including his correspondence with Busoni (these papers survived and were recovered).

He moved to the United States, working first at Cornell University and later at Mills College in Oakland, California. He refused ever to play in Germany again. In 1955 he became a naturalised American citizen.

Though a Dutch citizen until he was 74, he never lived in the Netherlands and was not at ease with the Dutch language. On one occasion when he performed for Queen Wilhelmina, they spoke German. He was fluent in German, English, French, Italian, Polish, and Russian.

Petri's students included Earl Wild, Ozan Marsh, John Ogdon, Dimitar Nenov and Xenia Boodberg Lee.

Petri had a superb technique and a powerful sonority and was a superlative exponent of the larger works of Beethoven, Liszt and Brahms.

Petri died on 27 May 1962 in Berkeley, California.

Students

See also
 List of Poles

References 

1881 births
1962 deaths
Dutch classical pianists
American classical pianists
Male classical pianists
American male pianists
Hochschule für Musik Carl Maria von Weber alumni
People who emigrated to escape Nazism
People educated at the Kreuzschule
Pupils of Ferruccio Busoni
Musicians from Hanover
20th-century classical pianists
20th-century American male musicians
Dutch emigrants to the United States